The Lonea (also: Luna) is a left tributary of the river Someșul Mic in Romania. It discharges into the Someșul Mic in Fundătura.

References

Rivers of Romania
Rivers of Cluj County